Erajpally is a village in the Nizamabad district of the state of Telangana, India.

Reference 

Villages in Nizamabad district